Banda Neira (also known as Pulau Neira)  is an island in the Banda Islands, Indonesia. It is administered as part of the administrative Banda Islands District (Kecamatan Kepulauan Banda) within the Central Maluku Regency in the province of Maluku. To the south is the main town of the same name, which is the largest town in the archipelago with around 7,000 inhabitants.

Geography
The island is at the center of the Banda Islands group, with the neighboring island of Banda Api is around 100 meters west, and Lontor is around 1.5 km to the south. Banda Api, Lontor and Banda Neira form the rim of a submerged caldera with a diameter of around seven kilometers.

History
Nutmeg is grown on the island and trade brought the inhabitants great wealth in the premodern period. Until the early 17th century, the Banda Islands were ruled by locals magnates called the Orang Kaya. The Portuguese first sailed to the Banda Islands in 1512, a year after Afonso de Albuquerque had conquered Malacca, which at the time was the hub of Asian trade. Only in 1529 did the Portuguese return to the islands, when Captain Garcia attempted to build a fort on Banda Neira. The local Bandanese turned against Garcia and his crew, forcing him to abandon his plans.

The Portuguese were replaced by the Dutch, who established friendly relations and a trading outpost in 1599, but in 1609 the Orang Kaya on Banda Neira rebelled against Dutch attempts to coerce a monopoly on the spice trade, killing 30 Netherlanders. This resulted in a brutal campaign against the people of Banda Islands by the Dutch.  Fort Belgica was built in 1611 to intimidate the Orang Kaya  and the English, who had established a fortress on the island of Run.

The Dutch conquest of the Banda Islands cumulated with the Banda Massacre of 1621, in which Jan Pieterszoon Coen, invaded the islands and subsequently began a campaign to commit genocide against the local inhabitants.

To keep the archipelago productive, the VOC repopulated the islands (including Banda Neira), mostly with slaves taken from the rest of modern-day Indonesia, India, the coast of China, working under command of Dutch planters (perkeniers). The original natives were also enslaved and were ordered to teach the newcomers about nutmeg and mace agriculture. The treatment of the slaves was severe—the native Bandanese population dropped to one hundred by 1681, and 200 slaves were imported annually to keep the slave population steady at 4,000. In this modern times, not many parkeniers survived though plantation owned by Pongky Van de Broeke, descendant of Paulus van den Broeke, brother of Pieter van den Broecke, still exist and regularly served tourists to the island. 

During the Dutch period, pro-independence activists Tjipto Mangoenkoesoemo, Sutan Sjahrir and Mohammad Hatta all spent time in internal exile on Banda Neira. The Dutch continued to rule the island until 1949, although the economic importance of nutmeg and mace declined greatly due to the loss of the Dutch monopoly after the British successfully planted nutmeg trees in other parts of the world (especially Penang and Grenada) following the Invasion of the Spice Islands in the Napoleonic Wars in 1810. Following Indonesian independence, the island has been administered as part of the Indonesian province of Maluku.

Banda Api erupted on May 10, 1988, from a N-SSW-trending fissure that cut across the island, with both explosive activity and lava effusion occurring.). The height of the eruption pillar was estimated at 3 to 5 kilometers on May 9; satellite measurements indicate an altitude of over 16 kilometers. To the south, north, and northwest of the summit, three craters formed, from which lava flows emerged that all reached the sea. The 1,800 islanders of Banda Api, as well as 5,000 of the then 6,000 or so residents of the island of Banda Neira were evacuated to Ambon, some 200 kilometers away. Three people died as a result of the volcanic eruptions and most of the inhabitants of Banda Api chose to relocate to Banda Neira.

See also 
 Dutch conquest of the Banda Islands (1621)

References

Sources

External links

East Indonesia travel information

Banda Islands
Central Maluku Regency